The Cook Islands national football team represents the country of the Cook Islands in international association football. It is fielded by the Cook Islands Football Association, the governing body of football in the Cook Islands, and competes as a member of the Oceania Football Confederation (OFC), which encompasses the countries of Oceania. Cook Islands played their first international match on 11 September 1971 in a 16–1 loss to Papua New Guinea in French Polynesia.

Cook Islands have competed in numerous competitions, and all players who have played in at least one international match, either as a member of the starting eleven or as a substitute, are listed below. Each player's details include his playing position while with the team, the number of caps earned and goals scored in all international matches, and details of the first and most recent matches played in. The names are initially ordered by number of caps (in descending order), then by date of debut, then by alphabetical order. All statistics are correct up to and including the match played on 17 March 2022.

Key

Players

References

Cook Islands international footballers
Association football player non-biographical articles